Joseph Cortese (born February 22, 1948) is an American actor who had major roles in films such as Windows (1980), Evilspeak (1981) and Monsignor (1982).

Early life
Cortese was born on February 22, 1948, in Paterson, New Jersey. He went to Midwestern College where he earned his BA in theatre. Cortese went to New York City and trained under Milton Katselas.

Career
Cortese has had major roles in films such as Windows (1980), Evilspeak (1981) and Monsignor (1982). His other film appearances include roles in Arizona Slim (1974), Jessi's Girls (1975), The Death Collector (1976), Deadly Illusion (1987), Ruby (1992), Illicit Dreams (1994), American History X (1998) and Against the Ropes (2004).

Personal life
Cortese was married to actress Kim Delaney from 1989 until their divorce in 1994. They have a son, Jack, born circa 1990.

Filmography

Film

Television

References

External links
 
 

1948 births
Male actors from New Jersey
American male film actors
American male television actors
Living people
Actors from Paterson, New Jersey